A creditor is a party that has a claim on the services of a second party.

Lender may also refer to:

Companies
 Lender's Bagels, brand of bagels

People
 Elfriede Lender (1882–1974), Estonian teacher and pedagogue
 Frantz Lender (1881-1927), Russian weapons designer
 Jay Lender (born 1969), American television writer
 Marcelle Lender (1862–1926), French singer, dancer and entertainer 
 Murray Lender (1930–2012), American businessman
 Voldemar Lender (1876–1939), Estonian engineer and mayor

See also
 Commercial lender (disambiguation)
 Ivan Lenđer (born 1990), Serbian swimmer
 Lander (surname)